This is a selected list of W. S. Gilbert's works, including all that have their own Wikipedia articles. For a complete list of Gilbert's dramatic works, see List of W. S. Gilbert dramatic works.

Poetry
 The Bab Ballads, a collection of comic verse published roughly between 1865 and 1871
 Songs of a Savoyard, London: George Routledge and Sons, 1890, a collection of Gilbert's song lyrics

Selected short stories
 Foggerty's Fairy and Other Tales, a collection of short stories and essays, mainly from before 1874.
 
 Links to several Gilbert stories

Publications that include one or more of Gilbert's short stories that are not in Foggerty's Fairy and Other Tales
  
Belgravia, vol. 2 (1867).  “From St. Paul’s to Piccadilly,” pp. 67–74
Fun, vol. 1 new series (1865-1866) (several contributions by Gilbert; near end of volume, Fun Christmas Number 1865, with Gilbert’s “The Astounding Adventure of Wheeler J. Calamity,” pp. 17–18)
London Society, vol. 13 (1868) (three “Thumbnail Sketches” by Gilbert, pp. 50–57, 132-136, 315-319)
On the Cards: Routledge’s Christmas Annual (1867) (“Diamonds,” pp. 25–37, and “The Converted Clown,” pp. 137–139)

Other books
The Pinafore Picture Book, London: George Bell & Sons, 1908, retelling the story of H.M.S. Pinafore for children, in prose narrative form
The Story of The Mikado, London: Daniel O'Connor, 1921, a similar retelling of The Mikado for children

Plays and musical stage works
Selected stage works that were important to Gilbert's career or were otherwise notable, in chronological order, excluding those listed under other headings below:
 Dulcamara, or the Little Duck and the Great Quack (1866 musical spoof of Donizetti's L'elisir d'amore). Gilbert's first solo success for the theatre, and the first of his five "operatic burlesques".
 La Vivandière (1867), a parody of Donizetti's La figlia del regimento
 Harlequin Cock Robin and Jenny Wren (1867), a Christmas pantomime.
 The Merry Zingara (1868), a parody of Michael Balfe's The Bohemian Girl
 Robert the Devil (1868), a parody of Meyerbeer's Robert le diable.  One of Gilbert's most successful early plays, it opened the Gaiety Theatre, London and ran in the provinces for 3 years.
 The Pretty Druidess (1869), a parody of Norma – the last of Gilbert's five "operatic burlesques"
 An Old Score (1869) (rewritten as "Quits!" in 1872) Gilbert's first full-length comedy.
 The Princess (1870). Musical farce; the precursor to Princess Ida.
 The Palace of Truth (1870). The first of Gilbert's blank verse "Fairy Comedies". 
 Creatures of Impulse (1871), with music by Alberto Randegger, based on Gilbert's 1870 short story called "A Strange Old Lady".
 Pygmalion and Galatea (1871). Gilbert's most successful work up to this time.  A reinterpretation of the Pygmalion myth in which the innocent former statue, Galatea, is unable to bear the cynicism and jealousies of the real world.
 Randall's Thumb (1871). A comedy that opened the Royal Court Theatre.
 The Wicked World (1873). A fairy comedy about how mortal love upsets the fairy world.
 The Happy Land (1873). This work was briefly banned for its sharp satire of government ministers. It also travesties The Wicked World.
 The Realm of Joy (1873). Set in the box office of a thinly-disguised The Happy Land, it satirises the audience for scandalous plays and the Lord Chamberlain's censorship of plays.
 The Wedding March (1873) a farce adapted from Un Chapeau de Paille d'Italie by Eugène Labiche
 Rosencrantz & Guildenstern (published 1874, performed 1891).  Gilbert's burlesque of Hamlet.
 Charity (1874). Concerns Victorian attitudes towards sex outside of marriage.  Anticipates the 1890s "problem plays" of Shaw, Ibsen.
 Sweethearts (1874). A drama about love revisited after 30 years.
 Tom Cobb (1875). This was possibly one of Gilbert's best comedies.
 Broken Hearts (1875).  The last of Gilbert's "fairy comedies", this was one of Gilbert's favourite plays.
 Dan'l Druce, Blacksmith (1876). A three-act drama that introduced antecedents of some of Gilbert's later characters.
 Engaged (1877). Probably the most famous of Gilbert's non-Sullivan works for the theatre.
 The Ne'er-do-Weel (1878); rewritten as "The Vagabond" after a few weeks.  Friendship, sacrifice and rotating lovers: it unsuccessfully combined sentimental scenes with comedy.
 The Forty Thieves (1878).  An "amateur pantomime at the Gaiety," written with three other writers, in which WSG played Harlequin.
 Gretchen (1879). One of Gilbert's favorites – his take on the Faust legend.
 Foggerty's Fairy (1881).  Gilbert's Back to the Future play.
 Brantinghame Hall (1888), a drama.  Gilbert's biggest flop, it sent producer Rutland Barrington into bankruptcy. 
 The Fortune Hunter (1897). Not a good play; its reception provoked WSG to announce retiring from writing for the stage.
 The Fairy's Dilemma (1904).  WSG finally works out a lifelong obsession with pantomime and harlequinade.
 The Hooligan (1911).  Gilbert's last play, written in a new, serious style.

German Reed Entertainments
Gilbert wrote six one-act musical entertainments for the German Reeds between 1869 and 1875.  They were successful in their own right and also helped form Gilbert's mature style as a dramatist. These include:
 No Cards (1869)
 Ages Ago (1869).  Gilbert's first collaboration with Frederic Clay, and his first hit with the German Reeds, running for 350 performances.
 Our Island Home (1870)
 A Sensation Novel (1871)
 Happy Arcadia (1872)
 Eyes and No Eyes (1875)

Early comic operas
 The Gentleman in Black (1870; music by Frederic Clay).  The score is lost.
 Les Brigands (1871), an English adaptation of Jacques Offenbach's operetta.
 Topsyturveydom (1874; music by Alfred Cellier). This one-act operetta concerns a country that is the opposite of England. The score is lost.
 Princess Toto (1876; music by Frederic Clay). A three-act opera, Gilbert's last with Clay.

The Gilbert and Sullivan operas
All of these comic operas are full-length two-act works, except for Trial by Jury, which is in one act, and Princess Ida, which is three acts. All except for Trial by Jury contain spoken dialogue; the dialogue in Princess Ida is written in blank verse.
 Thespis (1871)
 Trial by Jury (1875)
 The Sorcerer (1877)
 H.M.S. Pinafore (1878)
 The Pirates of Penzance (1879)
 Patience (1881)
 Iolanthe (1882)
 Princess Ida (1884)
 The Mikado (1885)
 Ruddigore (1887)
 The Yeomen of the Guard (1888)
 The Gondoliers (1889)
 Utopia, Limited (1893)
 The Grand Duke (1896)

Later operas without Sullivan
Though not as popular as the works with Arthur Sullivan, a few of Gilbert's later comic operas arguably have stronger plots than the last two Gilbert and Sullivan operas.
 The Mountebanks (1892; music by Alfred Cellier). This is the "lozenge plot" that Sullivan declined to set on several occasions.
 Haste to the Wedding (1892; music by George Grossmith). An unsuccessful adaptation of The Wedding March.
 His Excellency (1894; with music by Osmond Carr). Gilbert felt that if Sullivan had set it, the piece would have been "another Mikado".
 Fallen Fairies (1909; music by Edward German). Gilbert's last opera, which was a failure.

Parlour ballads
Gilbert is known to have written lyrics for twelve parlour ballads.  These are:
"The Yarn of the Nancy Bell", with music by Alfred Plumpton.  One of the Bab Ballads.  Published by Charles Jeffreys in 1869.
"Thady O'Flynn", with music by James L. Molloy.  Published by Boosey & Co on 7 October 1868.  From No Cards.
"Would You Know that Maiden Fair", with music by Frederic Clay.  From Ages Ago. Published by Boosey c. 1869.
"Corisande", with music by James L. Molloy.  Published by Boosey on 18 June 1870.
"Eily's Reason", with music by James L. Molloy.  Published by Boosey on 27 February 1871.
Three songs from A Sensation Novel: "The Detective's Song", "The Tyrannical Bridegroom", and "The Jewel".  Published by Hopwood & Co in 1871.
"The Distant Shore", with music by Arthur Sullivan.  Published by Chappell & Co on 18 December 1874.
"The Love that Loves me Not", with music by Arthur Sullivan.  Published by Novello, Ewer & Co in 1875.
"Sweethearts", with music by Arthur Sullivan.  Based on the play of the same name and used to promote it.  Published by Chappell & Co in 1875.
"Let Me Stay", with music by Walter Maynard.  Published by Boosey on 13 December 1875.  The same lyric was set by Edward German for Broken Hearts.

See also
List of W. S. Gilbert dramatic works
List of musical compositions by Arthur Sullivan

Notes

References
Allen, Reginald (1963), W. S. Gilbert: An Anniversary Survey and Exhibition Checklist with Thirty-five Illustrations, The Biographical Society of the University of Virginia, Charlottesville, Virginia.
 
 
 
 
 
 

 
Bibliographies by writer
Bibliographies of British writers
Dramatist and playwright bibliographies